The 49th Karlovy Vary International Film Festival took place from 4 to 12 July 2014. The Crystal Globe was won by Corn Island, a Georgian drama film directed by Giorgi Ovashvili. The second prize, the Special Jury Prize was won by Free Fall, a Hungarian comedy film directed by György Pálfi.

Juries
The following people formed the juries of the festival: 
Main competition
 Luis Miñarro, Grand Jury President (Spain)
 Mira Fornay (Slovakia)
 Phedon Papamichael (Greece)
 Kjartan Sveinsson (Iceland)
 Viktor Tauš (Czech Republic)
Documentaries
 Philippa Kowarsky, Chairman (Israel)
 Oskar Alegria (Spain)
 Tomáš Bojar (Czech Republic)
East of the West
 Ahmet Boyacıoğlu, Chairman (Turkey)
 Ivana Ivišić (Croatia)
 Levan Koguashvili (Georgia)
 Amanda Livanou (Greece)
 Tomasz Wasilewski (Poland)

Official selection awards
The following feature films and people received the official selection awards:
 Crystal Globe (Grand Prix) - Corn Island (Simindis kundzuli) by Giorgi Ovashvili (Georgia, Germany, France, Czech Republic, Kazakhstan)
 Special Jury Prize - Free Fall (Szabadesés) by György Pálfi (Hungary, France, South Korea)
 Best Director Award - György Pálfi for Free Fall ( Szabadesés) (Hungary, France, South Korea)
 Best Actress Award - Elle Fanning for her role in Low Down (USA)
 Best Actor Award - Nahuel Pérez Biscayart for his role in All Yours (Je suis à toi) (Belgium, Canada)

Other statutory awards
Other statutory awards that were conferred at the festival:
 Best documentary film (over 30 min) - Waiting for August by Teodora Ana Mihai (Belgium)
 Special Mention - Steadiness (Sitzfleisch) by Lisa Weber (Austria)
 Best documentary film (under 30 min) - Autofocus by Boris Poljak (Croatia)
 Special Mention - The Queen (La reina) by Manuel Abramovich (Argentina)
 East of the West Award - Corrections Class by Ivan Tverdovskiy (Russia, Germany)
 Special Mention - Barbarians (Varvari) by Ivan Ikić (Serbia, Montenegro, Slovenia)
 Forum of Independents Award - Anywhere Else (Anderswo) by Ester Amrami (Germany)
 Crystal Globe for Outstanding Artistic Contribution to World Cinema - Mel Gibson (USA), William Friedkin (USA)
 Festival President's Award for Contribution to Czech Cinematography - Zdeněk Svěrák (Czech Republic)
 Audience Award - The Magic Voice of a Rebel by Olga Sommerová (Czech Republic)

Non-statutory awards
The following non-statutory awards were conferred at the festival:
 FIPRESCI International Critics Award: Rocks in My Pockets (animated film) by Signe Baumane (USA, Latvia)
 Prize of the Ecumenical Jury: Corn Island (Simindis kundzuli) by Giorgi Ovashvili (Georgia, Germany, France, Czech Republic, Kazakhstan)
 Special Mention: Rocks in My Pockets (animated film) by Signe Baumane (USA, Latvia)
 FEDEORA Award (East of the West section): Bota by  Iris Elezi & Thomas Logoreci (Albania, Italy, Kosovo) 
 Europa Cinemas Label: Free Fall ( Szabadesés) by György Pálfi (Hungary, France, South Korea)

References

2014 film awards
Karlovy Vary International Film Festival